Hope is a 2003 compilation album released by the War Child charity in conjunction with Daily Mirror to aid the victims of the Iraq War. It features contributions from Travis, New Order, Paul McCartney, David Bowie and George Michael.

Track listing

References

2003 compilation albums
War Child albums